Yasmin Maree Catley is an Australian politician who was elected to the New South Wales Legislative Assembly as the member for Swansea for the Labor Party at the 2015 New South Wales state election.

Formerly a librarian with the Lake Macquarie City Council, she has worked in the offices of Federal Labor MPs Greg Combet and Anthony Albanese. She is married to Robert Coombs who himself served as the member for Swansea from 2007 to 2011.

Yasmin was appointed to the Shadow Ministry by NSW Labor Leader Luke Foley as the Shadow Minister for Innovation and Better Regulation in March 2015.

From June 2019 to May 2021, Catley was Deputy Leader of the ALP and hence Deputy Leader of the Opposition. Catley resigned as deputy leader on 28 May 2021 along with leader Jodi McKay.

References

External links
 
 

Living people
People from the Central Coast (New South Wales)
Australian Labor Party members of the Parliament of New South Wales
Members of the New South Wales Legislative Assembly
Labor Left politicians
Year of birth missing (living people)
21st-century Australian politicians
Women members of the New South Wales Legislative Assembly
21st-century Australian women politicians